

Top prize money earners – Australian and New Zealand horses

* denotes still racing

The criteria for inclusion in the above list are as follows.  The purpose of these criteria is to include only horses that should be recognised as being Australasian.
 Horse must have earned at least $5,000,000 (AUD) in total career prizemoney according to Racing Australia (http://www.racingaustralia.horse/).
 Horse must have earned at least $2,500,000 (AUD) in total career prizemoney in Australian and/or New Zealand races. Example of horse excluded:  Elegant Fashion [(Aus), Danewin - Wily Trick (USA)] won $6,813,232 in career prizemoney, however only $842,600 of that was won in Australian races (the remainder was won in Hong Kong).
 Horse must have earned $1,000,000 (AUD) in Australia and/or New Zealand races and/or won at least one Group 1 race when officially trained in Australia or New Zealand. Examples of horses excluded:  Dunaden [(Fr), Nicobar (GB) - La Marlia (Fr)] won $8,122,328 (AUD) in career prizemoney, of which $5,600,000 was earned in Australian races (including two Australian Group 1 wins).  However, as Dunaden was never officially trained in Australia it has not been included.  Americain [(USA), Dynaformer (USA) - America (Ire)] won $5,923,677 (AUD) in career prizemoney, and earned more than $2,500,000 in Australian races.  Americain was trained in Australia (by David Hayes) for a short period, however won less than $1,000,000 during that time and did not win a Group 1 race during that time.

Highest 50
Currently out-of-date (refer to list above for highest prize money earners) 

 Delta Blues has mainly won his prize money in Japan. Elegant Fashion has mainly won hers in Hong Kong. Cape of Good Hope has mainly won his prize money in the UK and Hong Kong. All three have won prize money in Australia. Happyanunoit should be included.

51–100

101–150

151–200

201–250

251 and higher 

° Still racing

Horses still racing
Viewed: $5,761,030 (Melbourne Cup Winner) (deceased 2010)
Shocking: $4,215,775 (Won 2009 Melbourne Cup)
Black Caviar:$3,912,550

Weekend Hussler: $3,068,900 (7 Group 1 wins)
Princess Coup (retired 2009): $2,858,339
Sirmione: $1,666,375
Zipping: $4,320,195
Master O'Reilly: $2,385,150
Wonderful World (retired 2007): $1,373,950
Sebring: $2,537,060
Nom Du Jeu: $1,946,874
Triple Honour: $1,553,410
Casino Prince (retired 2008): $1,166,500 
Sniper's Bullet: $1,371,075
No Wine No Song: $1,051,940
La Montagna: $1,081,650
Littorio: $1,023,475
Magnus (retired 2008): $1,298,397
Seachange (retired 2008): $1,418,276
Maldivian (retired 2009): $2,541,550
Samantha Miss(retired 2009): $1,734,760
Whobegotyou: $1,178,950
Rebel Raider(retired 2011): $1,053,870
Scenic Blast: $1,893,094

Delta Blues $8,052,535
Takeover Target (retired 2009) $6,028,311
Efficient $4,246,525
Eremein $4,260,445
Racing to Win $3,471,785
Railings (retired 2008): $3,172,110 
Pop Rock $2,656,110
Desert War (retired)$3,046,610
Tawqeet (retired 2007) $2,340,548
County Tyrone(retired) $2,316,420 
Roman Arch (retired) $2,114,230 
Super Elegant (retired 2007) $2,043,150
Haradasun (retired 2008) $2,731,170
Grey Song (retired 2006) $1,951,500 
Bomber Bill (retired 2007) $1,892,330
Gold Edition (retired 2008) $3,182,195
Honor in War (retired 2008)  $1,993,541
Paratroopers $1,930,185
El Segundo (retired 2007) $3,791,875 
Lad of the Manor (retired 2007): $1,661,150
Yell (retired) $1,566,450
Headturner (retired) $1,598,035
Our Smoking Joe (retired 2008) $1,586,700 
Miss Andretti (retired 2008) $2,848,991
Mr Murphy (retired 2006) $1,500,250
Spark of Life $1,529,260
Xcellent (retired 2008) $1,483,938 
Mnemosyne (retired 2006) $1,371,975
Aqua D’Amore (retired 2007) $1,936,850
Casual Pass (retired 2008) $1,432,600
Titanic Jack (retired 2006) $1,228,950
Red Oog (retired 2008) $1,188,385
Apache Cat (retired 2010): $3,439,225
Niconero (retired 2009) $2,186,680
On a Jeune(retired 2007) $1,274,430
Mahtoum $1,061,660
Undue $1,119,255
Pompeii Ruler $1,760,400
Mentality$1,939,195
Belle Bizarre$1,008,090
Blutigeroo $2,028,575
Forensics (retired 2009): $3,487,500
Divine Madonna (retired 2008) $2,013,390 
Fiumicino $1,438,725
Tuesday Joy (retired 2009): $2,894,050
Gallic (retired 2007) $1,374,550
Bentley Biscuit (retired 2008) $1,446,725
Gilded Venom $1,131,985 
Theseo $1,559,280 
Mimi Lebrock (retired 2009): $1,152,095 
Sarrera $1,027,350
Mr Baritone $1,034,845
Valedictum (retired 2009) $1,239,578

See also
 Horse racing in Australia
 Australian Racing Hall of Fame
 Australian Champion Racehorse of the Year
 List of Melbourne Cup winners
 List of Cox Plate winners

References

Horse racing in Australia
millionaire